Statistics of the 1987–88 Saudi Premier League.

Stadia and locations

League table

Promoted: Al Hajr and Al Rouda
Full records are not known at this time

External links 
 RSSSF Stats
 Saudi Arabia Football Federation
 Saudi League Statistics

Saudi Premier League seasons
Saudi Professional League
Professional League